The Sahrawi peseta is the currency of the partially recognized Sahrawi Arab Democratic Republic. It is divided in 100 céntimos, although coins with this denomination have never been minted, nor have banknotes been printed.

The first Sahrawi pesetas were minted in 1990, but they were not adopted as the national coin of Western Sahara until 1997. As this territory is mostly controlled by Morocco, the circulating currency in that part of the country is the Moroccan dirham, with Algerian dinars and Mauritanian ouguiyas circulating alongside the Sahrawi peseta in the Sahrawi refugee camps and the SADR-controlled part of Western Sahara.

As it is not an official currency and not circulating, the exchange rate is not realistic. Despite this, the Sahrawi peseta was pegged at par to the Spanish peseta and, when the latter was phased out for the euro, the rate became €1 for 166.386 Pts.

Coins 

Non-commemorative coins are supposedly designated for circulation. They are made from cupronickel. The denominations are: 1, 2, 5, 10, 50, 100, 200 and 500 pesetas.

There have also been commemorative issues in copper, silver and gold, as some of those shown here:

See also 
 Algerian dinar
 Mauritanian ouguiya
 Moroccan dirham
 Spanish peseta

Notes

References 

Currencies of Africa
Peso
Sahrawi Arab Democratic Republic
Law of the Sahrawi Arab Democratic Republic